Bruce Bonafede is an American author, award-winning playwright, and ghostwriter living in Southern California. He is the author of Nobody Knows My Name by Anonymous, a humor book published by Mill City Press in 2013. Nobody Knows My Name by Anonymous is a series of short comedy pieces that takes a humorous and satirical look at fame and the desire to be famous.

Bonafede's first produced play, Advice to the Players, is a serious drama that studies the relationship between art and life. The play's inspiration was an incident at the 1981 International Theater Festival in Baltimore, where two acclaimed South African actors were caught up in an international boycott of South Africa's apartheid policies. The play was first produced as part of Actors Theatre of Louisville's "Shorts" Festival in November 1984, the original production starred Delroy Lindo and Joe Morton. The play was produced again at the Actors Theatre of Louisville Humana Festival for New American Plays in April 1985, and won the Heideman Award as best one-act play of the festival. Following the production at Actors Theatre of Louisville, Bonafede revised the play into a 90-minute version without intermission, which was produced at the Philadelphia Festival of New Plays in 1986. Advice to the Players was published in Literary Cavalcade, a Scholastic magazine, and the anthology Best Short Plays-1986, edited by Ramon Delgado. The production version of the play was published by Samuel French in 1985.

Ghostwriting

Bonafede is a contributor and editor for the business book Manager's Guide to Crisis Management by Jonathan Bernstein (Briefcase Books Series), published in 2011.

Other writing projects must remain confidential due to contractual agreements.

Awards

Advice to the Players, his first produced play, won the Heideman Award at the Humana Festival of New American Plays at Actors Theatre of Louisville in 1985.

Published works

 Advice to the Players (1985)
 Nobody Knows My Name by Anonymous (2013)

References

External links
 Official site

Writers from California
American dramatists and playwrights
Ghostwriters
Year of birth missing (living people)
Place of birth missing (living people)
Living people